Maple Beach may refer to the following places:

in the United States:
 Maple Beach, Pennsylvania
 Maple Beach, Washington
 Maple Beach, Wisconsin

in Canada:
 Maple Beach, Ontario